William Thomson (29 April 1874 – 12 December 1917) was a Scottish footballer who played as a right winger.

Career
Born in Dundee, Thomson played club football in the Scottish Football League for Dundee, and in the English Football League for Bolton Wanderers. He made one appearance for Scotland in 1896.

He died in an accident while working as a shipyard engineer during World War I.

References

1874 births
1917 deaths
Scottish footballers
Scottish Football League players
English Football League players
Scotland international footballers
Dundee Our Boys F.C. players
Dundee F.C. players
Victoria United F.C. players
Bolton Wanderers F.C. players
Bristol City F.C. players
Association football outside forwards
Footballers from Dundee
Accidental deaths in Scotland
Industrial accident deaths